Donny Gary Barnard (born 1 July 1984) is a professional footballer who plays for Harlow Town.

Career
Barnard came up through the youth ranks at Leyton Orient, and wore the #2 and previously #23 shirt. He was reduced to mainly a substitute place for much of the seasons that he was part of the Leyton Orient first team squad. He was a utility player, who could play at right back, left back or in midfield. He was released at the end of the 2006–07 season and signed for Grays Athletic.

He was released from Grays Athletic on 26 September 2007 and signed for AFC Hornchurch in October the same year.

In November 2009 Barnard joined Tilbury and has been a regular in the first team squad.

Barnard was released by Tilbury in the summer of 2010 and joined Harlow Town in the Isthmian League Division One North.

References

External links

1984 births
Living people
Association football defenders
Association football midfielders
English Football League players
National League (English football) players
Leyton Orient F.C. players
Grays Athletic F.C. players
Hornchurch F.C. players
Tilbury F.C. players
Harlow Town F.C. players
Isthmian League players
English footballers
Footballers from Forest Gate